Michael Brenner (born 4 January 1964) is a German historian who researches and publishes on the history of Jews and Israel. Brenner has authored eight books on Jewish History, which were translated into twelve languages and is the editor and co-editor of eighteen books. He holds teaching positions at both the Ludwig Maximilian University of Munich and the American University.

Early life and academic career 

Brenner was born in Weiden. He studied at the university and the Hochschule für Jüdische Studien in Heidelberg, the Hebrew University of Jerusalem and Columbia University in New York. He wrote his dissertation at Columbia University on Jewish culture in the Weimar Republic. From 1993 to 1994 he was assistant professor at Indiana University in Bloomington and from 1994 until 1997 at Brandeis University. Since 1997 he has taught as the chair for Jewish History and Culture at Ludwig Maximilian University of Munich. Since 2013 he has also been the Seymour and Lillian Abensohn Chair in Israel Studies at the  American University, Washington D.C. He has been visiting professor at numerous universities, among them Berkeley, Stanford, Johns Hopkins, Haifa, Central European University Budapest, and ETH Zürich.

Brenner, who frequently takes positions on public issues, is a considered a prominent critic of the party "Alternative for Germany" (AfD), against which he has repeatedly spoken out.

Honors and awards
In 1981, Michael Brenner won the first prize of the German-wide Federal President's History Competition among 13,000 competitors.

From 1998 to 2009  Brenner was chair of the academic board of the Wissenschaftliche Arbeitsgemeinschaft des Leo Baeck Instituts in Germany. In 2013 he was appointed International President of the Leo Baeck Institute International. Since 2009 he has been elected fellow of the Bavarian Academy of Sciences and Humanities, since 2012 of the Accademia Nazionale Virgiliana in Mantua, and since 2014 of the American Academy of Jewish Research.  On 20 November 2014 German Minister of Justice Heiko Maas awarded Brenner with the highest decoration in Germany, the Federal Cross of Merit during a ceremony at the Leo Baeck Institute, New York On 7 December 2020 The Knapp Family Foundation and the University of Vienna announced the establishment of the Salo W. and Jeannette M. Baron Award for Scholarly Excellence in Research on the Jewish Experience with the award going to Brenner as the first Senior Laureate citing his scholarly work and lived experience bridging the US and Europe.

Selection of publications in English

As author 
 ISBN 978-0691203973.

(as co-author, Awarded with National Jewish Book Award for Jewish History 1997)

As editor 
  (with Franziska Davies und Martin Schulze-Wessel)
 (with Lauren B. Strauss)
 (with Gideon Reuveni)
  (with Vicki Caron and Uri R. Kaufmann)
 (with Rainer Liedtke and David Rechter)
 (with Derek Penslar)

References

Links 
 American University faculty page

20th-century German historians
Jewish historians
20th-century German Jews
1964 births
Living people
American University faculty and staff
Recipients of the Cross of the Order of Merit of the Federal Republic of Germany